Beach Street may refer to:

Beach Street (Manhattan)
Beach Street, Fremantle, Australia
Beach Street, George Town, Penang
Beach Street Records

See also 
 Beach Road (disambiguation)
 Beech Street (disambiguation)
 Streets Beach